The Usambara hyliota (Hyliota usambara) is a species of Hyliota.
It is found only in the Usambara Mountains in Tanga Region of Tanzania.

Its natural habitats are subtropical or tropical moist lowland forests, subtropical or tropical moist montane forests, and plantations.
It is threatened by habitat loss.

References

Hyliota
Endemic birds of Tanzania
Usambara hyliota
Usambara hyliota
Taxonomy articles created by Polbot